Ma On Shan Road is a major road in the new town of Ma On Shan in the New Territories of Hong Kong. The road extends northward from Tate's Cairn Highway near Tai Shui Hang along the eastern bank of the Shing Mun River. It ends in the north when it joins Sai Sha Road near Wu Kai Sha. Its branch road, the Ma On Shan Bypass, redirects traffic between Sha Tin and Sai Kung North away from the town centre near the Heng On Estate. It is the primary thoroughfare to Ma On Shan. A short section of the road north of Tate's Cairn Highway is an expressway.

See also

Ma On Shan
Sai Sha Road
List of streets and roads in Hong Kong

Ma On Shan
Sha Tin District
Roads in the New Territories